Nadine Salameh (born February 9, 1979, in Beirut, Lebanon), sometimes credited as Nadeen Salameh, is a Palestinian actress well known in Syria, where she lived and worked for most of her life.

Family and childhood
Before fleeing to Lebanon, after being forced out of their homeland, her family was originally from Acre, Palestine. She also had a Syrian and Turkish ancestry.

Her father, Nabil Salameh was an activist with the Palestine Liberation Organization (PLO). Initially he was associated with Yasser Arafat's Fatah movement, and later he co-founded the more extreme Black September organization. During the 1982 Israeli intervention in Lebanon he went missing, with the presumption by family and friends he was captured by Israel. He has remained missing since this event, which occurred when Nadine was three years old.

The Lebanese Civil War caused her to go to Syria, with her mother and two sisters. In Damascus, she studied in the Department of Acting of the Higher Academy of Theatrical Arts. She also studied Law at the Damascus University and had a master's degree in Political Sciences. She was mentored by some of Syria’s best known actors, including Naila Al Atrash, and Jihad Sa’d.

Acting career
While a freshman in college, Nadine made her first TV series with the famous Syrian director Najdat Ismail Anzour called al-Kawasir. It was a 29-episode fantasy epic set in medieval Arabia about chivalry, war, love, and tribalism. In it, Nadine played the role of Zumuruda, a horse-riding, sword-flashing barbaric heroin. She has since made one play, two TV movies, one film for the cinema, and over ten television TV series.

Her most notable works are the movie Ru’aa Halima (Vision of a Dreamer) and the TV series al-Taghriba al-Filastiniyya (The Palestinian Exile). In Ru’aa Halima, she plays Jamila, a shy but revolutionary young girl in conservative Damascus during the 1970s who wants to explore the world, but is prohibited from doing so due to her restrictive father and the old-fashioned society she lives in. Her feminine awakening coincides with her national consciousness, and in despair from her surrounding, she escapes to Lebanon to join the PLO forces after the Israeli invasion of Beirut in 1982, seeing death, or "resistance", as the only solution to her suffering.

Al-Taghriba al-Filistiniyya (The Palestinian Exile), directed by Hatem Ali, is her other significant work, where Nadine stars with Syrian actor Jamal Suliman. The series, about twentieth century Palestinian history, recounts the Palestinian uprising of 1936 against the British Mandate and the Zionist immigrants coming from Europe (actual Zionist immigration came from around the world including North Africa and the Southwest Asia). The movie is set in Haifa, Israel; and uses the Palestinian dialect of the Arabic language. Her other notable works include Faris Bani Marwan, Khalf al-Qudban (Men Behind Bars), Ashwak Na'ima (Soft Thorns), and Ahl al-Gharam (The People of Passion).

Personal life
She married a Lebanese businessman in 2011, with whom she had two daughters.

Filmography
Al-Kawasir (1998) - TV
Masrahi wa Masrahiyya (1999) - TV
Lil Amal Awdeh (1999) - TV
Al-Mizan (1999) - TV
Amir al-Qulub (1999) – TV Movie
Al-Ayyam al-Mutamarrida (1999) - TV
Spotlight (2000) - TV
Al-Basir (2000) - TV
Radm al-Asatir (2001) - TV
Ru'a Halima (2001) - Film
Zaman al-Wasl (2001) - TV
Soura (2002) - TV Film
Unshudet al-Matar (2003) - TV
Zamat al-Samt (2003) - TV
Tarek Ibin Ziyad (2003) - TV
Kihl al-Iyoun (2004) - TV
Hikayat Kharif (2004) - TV
Asr al-Junon (2004) - TV
Kihl al-Iyoun (2004) - TV
Faris Bani Marwan (2004) - TV
Al-Taghriba al-Filastiniyya (2004) - TV
Ashwak Na'ima (2005) - TV
Asiyya al-Dame (2005) - TV
Ahl al-Gharam (2006) - TV
al-Batreek (2006) - Short film
Ratl Kamel Min al-Ashjar (2006) - Short film.
Sada al-Roh (2006)
Wasmet Aar (2007) - TV
Al-yawm al rabe wa al-thalatin (2006)- Documentary
Rasael al-Hubb wa al-Harb (2007)- TV
Katheer Min al-Hubb katheer Min al-Ounf (2007)- TV
Haza al-Aalam (2007) - TV
Jubba (2007) - Cinema
Sabe Dakaik ila Muntasaf al-Layl (2007) - Cinema

References

External links
 Official web site
  (note:  entry is incomplete and uses different English spelling)
  Playing the popularity game (November 27, 2003) - Article by Sami Moubayed in Egypt's Al-Ahram Weekly, which mentions her father Nabil Salameh and his disappearance.

Palestinian film actresses
Palestinian television actresses
Actresses from Beirut
1979 births
Living people
20th-century Palestinian actresses
21st-century Palestinian actresses
Syrian people of Palestinian descent
Damascus University alumni